1121 Natascha is a background asteroid from the central regions of the asteroid belt. It was discovered on 11 September 1928, by Soviet astronomer Pelageya Shajn at the Simeiz Observatory on the Crimean peninsula. It was named for Natasha Tichomirova, daughter of astronomer Grigory Neujmin.

Orbit and classification 

Natascha is a non-family asteroid from the main belt's background population. Conversely, the asteroid is also considered a core member of the disputed Astraea family. It orbits the Sun in the central main-belt at a distance of 2.1–3.0 AU once every 4 years and 1 month (1,484 days; semi-major axis of 2.55 AU). Its orbit has an eccentricity of 0.16 and an inclination of 6° with respect to the ecliptic. The body's observation arc begins at Heidelberg Observatory in February 1930, or 17 months after its official discovery observation at Simeiz.

Naming 

This minor planet was named as a birthday present for Soviet hydrogeologist Natasha (Natalia) Tichomirova, daughter of Grigory Neujmin, who was an astronomer at the discovering Simeiz Observatory and prolific discoverer of minor planets himself. The author of the Dictionary of Minor Planet Names, Lutz Schmadel, learned about the naming circumstances from Crimean astronomers N. Solovaya, Nataliya Sergeevna Samoilova-Yakhontova and Nikolai Chernykh (also see  and ).

Physical characteristics 

Natascha is an assumed, stony S-type asteroid.

Rotation period and poles 

In May 2012, a rotational lightcurve of Natascha was obtained from photometric observations by astronomers at the Oakley Southern Sky Observatory in Australia. Lightcurve analysis gave a well-defined rotation period of 13.197 hours with a brightness variation of 0.51 magnitude. A high brightness amplitude typically indicates a non-spherical shape.

In 2016, a modeled lightcurve was published using photometric data from the Lowell Photometric Database. Lightcurve inversion gave a concurring period of  hours, as well as two spin axes of (16.0°, 59.0°) and (209.0°, 50.0°) in ecliptic coordinates (λ, β).

Diameter and albedo 

According to the surveys carried out by the Japanese Akari satellite and the NEOWISE mission of NASA's Wide-field Infrared Survey Explorer, Natascha measures between 12.859 and 14.52 kilometers in diameter and its surface has an albedo between 0.160 and 0.294.

The Collaborative Asteroid Lightcurve Link assumes a standard albedo for stony asteroids of 0.20 and calculates a diameter of 14.89 kilometers based on an absolute magnitude of 11.5.

References

External links 
 Lightcurve Database Query (LCDB), at www.minorplanet.info
 Dictionary of Minor Planet Names, (1121) Natascha, Google books
 Asteroids and comets rotation curves, CdR – Geneva Observatory, Raoul Behrend
 Discovery Circumstances: Numbered Minor Planets (1)-(5000) – Minor Planet Center
 
 

001121
Discoveries by Pelageya Shajn
Named minor planets
19280911